Cinerama is a cinema in central Rotterdam, the Netherlands. It started in 1960 and was rebuilt in the 1980s. It has seven screens and is owned by the Kinepolis group.

The cinema screens both arthouse and mainstream films. It also hosts a variety of festival screenings such as Arab Cinema, IFFR and the Wildlife film festival.

History
Cinerama was opened in July 1960, occupying the site of the former Scala cinema, which had gone bankrupt after just 3 years. It was named after the Cinerama projection system. The first film screened was This is Cinerama.

Capacity

The current capacity for the seven screens are as follows:
Screen 1 - 291
Screen 2 - 123
Screen 3 - 123
Screen 4 - 88
Screen 5 - 145
Screen 6 - 145
Screen 7 - 67

References

Buildings and structures in Rotterdam
Cinemas and movie theaters in the Netherlands
Rotterdam